Bogue Chitto is a census-designated place (CDP) situated in Kemper and Neshoba counties, Mississippi. The population was 864 at the 2020 census. It is part of the Mississippi Band of Choctaw Indians Reservation and the population is 93% Choctaw.

History
Three civil rights workers: James Chaney, Andrew Goodman and Michael Schwerner were killed by the KKK about 10 miles north of Bogue Chitto on the night of June 21, 1964. Their bodies were discovered buried in an earthen dam on the Old Jolly Farm in Neshoba County, Mississippi in August, 1964. The crime was later described in the 1988 film Mississippi Burning.

Geography
Much of the Mississippi Choctaw Indian Reservation is in Neshoba County with a portion extending into western Kemper County. Bogue Chitto is one of 8 communities in the nation.

According to the United States Census Bureau, the CDP has a total area of 6.3 square miles (16.4 km), of which 6.3 square miles (16.3 km) are land and 0.04 square mile (0.1 km) (0.63%) is water.

Demographics

As of the 2020 United States census, there were 864 people, 114 households, and 92 families residing in the CDP.

As of the census of 2000, there were 533 people, 160 households, and 127 families residing in the CDP. The population density was 84.6 people per square mile (32.7/km). There were 169 housing units at an average density of 26.8/sq mi (10.4/km). The racial makeup of the CDP was 5.82% White, 0.38% African American, 92.68% Native American, and 1.13% from two or more races. Hispanic or Latino comprised 0.38% of the population.

There were 160 households, out of which 40.6% had children under the age of 18 living with them, 31.9% were married couples living together, 31.9% had a female householder with no husband present, and 20.6% were non-families. 11.9% of all households were made up of individuals, and 3.1% had someone living alone who was 65 years of age or older. The average household size was 3.33 and the average family size was 3.48.

In the CDP, the population was spread out, with 34.1% under the age of 18, 11.1% from 18 to 24, 31.0% from 25 to 44, 16.9% from 45 to 64, and 6.9% who were 65 years of age or older. The median age was 28 years. For every 100 females, there were 94.5 males. For every 100 females age 18 and over, there were 86.7 males.

The median income for a household in the CDP was $18,641, and the median income for a family was $16,597. Males had a median income of $18,250 versus $15,240 for females. The per capita income for the CDP was $6,080. About 56.1% of families and 54.2% of the population were below the poverty line, including 58.3% of those under age 18 and 80.6% of those age 65 or over.

Education
The Neshoba County portion of Bogue Chitto is served by the Neshoba County School District. The Kemper County School District serves the portion of Bogue Chitto that lies in Kemper County.

Native American students are eligible to attend schools in the Choctaw Tribal School System, a tribal school system operated by the Mississippi Band of Choctaw Indians. Bogue Chitto Elementary School is in the community.

Notable people
 The Hodges Brothers, bluegrass quartet

References

Census-designated places in Neshoba County, Mississippi
Census-designated places in Kemper County, Mississippi
Census-designated places in Mississippi
Census-designated places in Meridian micropolitan area
Mississippi Band of Choctaw Indians
Mississippi placenames of Native American origin